Princess Maria Eleonore of Hesse-Rotenburg (Maria Eleonore Amalia; 25 February 1675 – 27 January 1720) was Landgravine of Hesse-Rotenburg by birth and was the Countess Palatine of Sulzbach by marriage. She is an ancestor of Albrecht, Duke of Bavaria.

Biography

Maria Eleonore was the second child of William, Landgrave of Hesse-Rotenburg and his wife Countess Maria Anna of Löwenstein-Wertheim-Rochefort. She was an older sister of Ernest Leopold of Hesse-Rotenburg, future ruler of her native Hesse-Rotenburg.

Engaged to Theodore Eustace of Sulzbach, the heir of the ruling Count Palatine of Sulzbach Christian Augustus, the couple were married on 9 June 1692 in Lobositz, Bohemia. The couple had some nine children three of which would have further progeny.

She died in Sulzbach at the age of 44.

Issue

Countess Palatine Amalia Auguste Maria Anna of Sulzbach (7 June 1693 – 18 January 1762) died unmarried.
Count Palatine Joseph Charles of Sulzbach (2 November 1694 – 18 July 1729) married Elisabeth Auguste of Neuburg and had issue.
Countess Palatine Francisca Christina of Sulzbach (16 May 1696 – 16 July 1776) Abbess of Essen.
Countess Palatine Ernestine Elizabeth Johanna of Sulzbach (15 May 1697 –  14 April 1775) married William II, Landgrave of Hesse-Wanfried-Rheinfels, no issue.
Count Palatine John William Philip of Sulzbach (3 June 1698 – 12 April 1699) died in infancy.
John Christian, Count Palatine of Sulzbach (23 January 1700 – 20 July 1733) married Maria Henriette de La Tour d'Auvergne and had issue; married Eleonore of Hesse-Rotenburg, no issue.
Countess Palatine Elisabeth Eleonore Auguste of Sulzbach (19 April 1702 – 10 February 1704) died in infancy.
Countess Palatine Anne Christine of Sulzbach (5 February 1704 – 12 March 1723) married Charles Emmanuel, Prince of Piedmont and had issue.
Count Palatine Johann Wilhelm August of Sulzbach (21 August 1706 – 28 August 1708) died in infancy.

References

1675 births
1720 deaths
Landgravines of Hesse-Rotenburg
17th-century German people
18th-century German people
Countesses Palatine of Sulzbach
House of Hesse-Kassel
House of Wittelsbach
Daughters of monarchs